The 1918 Miami Redskins football team was an American football team that represented Miami University as a member of the Ohio Athletic Conference (OAC) during the 1918 college football season. In its second season under head coach George Rider, Miami compiled a 5–0–1 record (4–0–1 against conference opponents). Miami claims the 1918 conference championship. The team's games against Kentucky, Wooster, and Witteberg were cancelled due to the 1918 flu pandemic.  

The season was part of a 27-game unbeaten streak that began in November 1915 and ended in October 1919.

Schedule

References

Miami
Miami RedHawks football seasons
Miami Redskins football